Valériane Vukosavljević (born 29 April 1994) is a French professional basketball player for USK Praha. She previously played for the San Antonio Stars of the Women's National Basketball Association (WNBA).

Personal life 
In July 2019, Ayayi married Filip Vukosavljević, a Serbian professional basketball player. Three of her siblings, all of whom are younger, play basketball: Joël played college basketball in the United States at Gonzaga University Professionally for the LA. Lakers summer league, currently on a 2-way deal with the Washington Wizards and has represented France at youth level, Gérald has played in France's third division as an amateur and was reportedly considering playing US college basketball, and Gérald has a twin sister who also plays the sport.

References

External links

1994 births
Living people
Basketball players at the 2016 Summer Olympics
Basketball players at the 2020 Summer Olympics
Black French sportspeople
French expatriate sportspeople in the Czech Republic
French expatriate basketball people in the United States
French women's basketball players
Olympic basketball players of France
San Antonio Stars players
Small forwards
French sportspeople of Beninese descent
Sportspeople from Bordeaux
France women's national basketball team players
Medalists at the 2020 Summer Olympics
Olympic medalists in basketball
Olympic bronze medalists for France